Giovanni Paolo Paladino or Jean-Paul Paladin (fl. 1540-1560) was an Italian composer and lutenist from Milan. He was born Giovanni Paolo Paladino and was also a merchant who maintained a large house and vinyard in Lyons. From 1516-22 he was lutenist to Francois I, from 1544 with Charles III of Lorraine, and from 1548-53 with Queen Mary of Scotland. Paladino published three books of lute music in Lyons in 1549, 1553 and 1560.

Works
Selected works include:
Gagliarda sopra la Paladina, lute solo
Fantasia, lute solo
Tablatura de lutz, collection
Premiire ìivre de tablature de lutti, collection

Discography
Paladino's music has been recorded and issued on media including:
TAbvlatvres de Levt, Astree AS 76, 1990
Early Italian Lute Music, 1986

References

External links
Paladino's Fantasia on Youtube.com

Date of birth unknown
Date of death unknown
Italian classical composers
Italian male classical composers
Renaissance composers
Italian lutenists
French lutenists